Dino Jelusić (born 4 June 1992), also known by his stage name Dino Jelusick, is a Croatian rock singer, musician, and songwriter. He is the founder, principal songwriter, and lead singer of progressive rock band Animal Drive, which was formed in 2012, and since 2017 has been signed to Frontiers Records. Besides working on several hard rock and metal projects, since 2016, Jelusick has been a touring member for American rock band Trans-Siberian Orchestra.

Early life
Jelusick was born Dino Jelusić on 4 June 1992 in Požega, Croatia. He lived most of his life in the capital city of Zagreb. He earned a master's degree from the Academy of Music, University of Zagreb, in 2020.

Career

1997–2005: First musical efforts and Junior Eurovision Song Contest
As his parents also played musical instruments, Jelusick was introduced to music and singing at the age of three, and started performing at the age of five by appearing on television, on stages, and festivals.

Jelusick wrote his first song in English at the age of seven. In 2003, he participated in the first Junior Eurovision Song Contest 2003 in Denmark with a song he wrote at the age of ten, "Ti si moja prva ljubav", and won with 134 points. Jelusick released his debut solo album, No. 1, in 2003, and an English version in 2004. He toured the United States, Scandinavia, and Australia until 2005, and the tour included four large concerts in Denmark with a total audience of 100,000 people. The same year, Jelusick became the youngest nominee of the Croatian music award Porin, at the age of twelve. In 2005, he was one of the three main acts at the Langeland festival in Denmark, along with UB40 and Ronan Keating.

2006–2014: Solo career and change to rock and metal musical style
Around 2007, as part of adolescence, Jelusick's voice changed and lost part of its upper register. Jelusick had grown up listening to King's X, Slash, Whitesnake, Dream Theater, and Toto, among others, he decided to change his musical direction to hard rock and metal.

In 2009, Jelusick began recording a new studio album in Melbourne, Australia, with producer Mark Berry, but finalized it with Swedish producer Robert Ahrling in Malmö. The album, released in August 2011, was titled Living My Own Life. However, as he did not write any of the songs on the album, Jelusick does not perform them live.

Between 2012 and 2013, Jelusick was hired to take part in an international project in South Africa called Synkropation. The project consisted of an album featuring the collaboration of different artists, including Mandoza and Dilana. Though the album was never released, Jelusick was featured on several songs, and played to an audience of 50,000 people.

In 2014, Jelusick was awarded second place at the international festival Slavianski Bazaar in Vitebsk in Belarus. Afterward, he began experiencing problems with his voice. In September, he underwent surgery for Reinke's edema. After the surgery, he recorded another album, this one entirely composed by him. A concept album titled Prošao sam sve, it was released in November 2014. The album is based on the autobiographical novel 260 days by Marijan Gubina, about a 10-year-old boy who survives 260 days of imprisonment in a war camp during the Croatian War of Independence (1991–1995).

2015–present: Band projects and joining Trans-Siberian Orchestra
In 2015, American drummer John Macaluso was looking for a singer and keyboardist for his new American-Croatian band Stone Leaders. Jelusick joined and helped record their self-titled album, which was eventually released in March 2019. During this time, Jelusick was also a member of Croatian metal band The Ralph, with whom he released the album Enter Escape in February 2017.

The same year, Jelusick won four awards at the Discovery festival in Bulgaria, one of which was for his song "Father". In 2016, he won at New Wave in Sochi, Russia, the largest singing contest for young performers in the world.

February 2016 was a turning point in Jelusick's music career. He later commented that until the mid–2010s, he had faced numerous difficulties within the Croatian music industry. Due to these problems, he considered ending his musical career.  Reportedly, his live performance of Queen's "The Show Must Go On" was noticed by American rock band Trans-Siberian Orchestra, who were searching for two male touring vocalists. After auditioning and meeting with producer Paul O'Neill, Jelusick was chosen to join the group. He took part in their 2016 winter tour. During the 2017 winter tour, the band, with Kayla Reeves on the East, and Jelusick on the West lineup, honored O'Neill while playing "The Safest Way into Tomorrow".

In the meantime, Jelusick's main project was working with the progressive hard rock band Animal Drive, founded in 2012. Their final lineup came together in 2015. Initially, this was his solo band, and he is the project's main songwriter. The group's biggest influence is the British hard rock band Whitesnake. Their live performances feature Whitesnake's 2004 cover version of Deep Purple's "Burn", as well as songs by Skid Row and Dream Theater. Before Jelusick joined TSO's tour, Animal Drive recorded a few songs, and on the recommendation of TSO's vocalist Jeff Scott Soto, the record label Frontiers Records listened to their work, and decided to sign a record deal with the band in 2017. They are the first Croatian rock band to sign with such a major record label and have an album published worldwide. Their debut studio album, Bite!, was released in February 2018 to critical acclaim. In April 2019, they released a covers EP titled Back to the Roots. It included a rendition of  Skid Row's "Monkey Business" as its first single, and Roxette's "The Look" (with guest vocalist Rosa Laricchiuta) as its second single, in May 2019. The album received very good reviews.

In 2018 and 2019, Jelusick performed in several episodes of the entertainment and music program A-strana of Hrvatska Radiotelevizija, and was the youngest mentor in the Croatian version of the BBC show Just the Two of Us. His appearance with partner and actress Tara Thaller managed to win the competition.

In May 2019, Lords of Black's Tony Hernando released a self-titled album with his solo project Restless Spirits. Jelusick sang on two of the album's tracks, "Cause I Know You're the One" and "Lost Time (Not to Be Found Again)". The record also included guest artists including Deen Castronovo, Johnny Gioeli, and Alessandro Del Vecchio. In late 2018, Jelusick recorded vocals and keyboards for a George Lynch project titled Dirty Shirley, which also featured Will Hunt on drums and Trevor Roxx on bass. The self-titled album was released in January 2020, to positive reviews.

In July 2021, Jelusick joined Whitesnake as a backing vocalist.

In March 2022, Jelusick joined Michael Romeo performing all vocals on Romeo's solo album War of the Worlds, Pt. 2. Matthias Mineur of the German edition of Metal Hammer said Jelusick "lifts" the album "to an even higher level" than that of its predecessor and finished his review saying that the release "inspires on two levels, so that the listener can hardly decide which of them is the more important.""

Selected discography

References

External links

 
 Animal Drive official website
 Dino Jelusick-Animal Drive official YouTube channel

1992 births
Living people
People from Požega, Croatia
21st-century Croatian male singers
Croatian child singers
Croatian baritones
Croatian rock singers
Junior Eurovision Song Contest entrants
Junior Eurovision Song Contest winners
Child rock musicians
Frontiers Records artists